The Roman Catholic Diocese of Kangding/Kanting is a Latin diocese in the ecclesiastical province of the Metropolitan of Chongqing in western China, but still dependent on the Roman Missionary Congregation Propaganda Fide.

Its episcopal see is located in the city of Kangding, know to the Tibetan as Dartsedo. It is vacant since 1962.

Territory 
The diocese includes the western part of Sichuan Province and theoretically the entire Tibet Autonomous Region.

History 

 Established on March 27, 1846 as Apostolic Vicariate of Lhassa 拉薩 (after its Tibetan see), on territory split off from the then Apostolic Vicariate of Szechwan 四川 and Apostolic Vicariate of Tibet-Hindustan
 Renamed on July 28, 1868 as Apostolic Vicariate of Tibet (西藏)
 Renamed on December 3, 1924 as Apostolic Vicariate of Tatsienlu (打箭爐)
 Lost territory on 15 December 1929 to establish the then Mission sui iuris of Sikkim (now diocese of Darjeeling)
 Promoted on April 11, 1946 and renamed after its see as Diocese of Kangding (康定)

Ordinaries 
(all Roman Rite)

 Apostolic Vicars of Lhassa 拉薩 
 Ignazio Persico, Capuchin Franciscans (O.F.M. Cap.) (1856.12.19 – 1860), Titular Bishop of Gratianopolis (Mauretania Caesariensis) (1854.03.08 – 1870.03.11); later Bishop of Savannah (USA) (1870.03.20 – 1874.06.20), Titular Bishop of Bolina (1874.06.23 – 1879.03.26) & Coadjutor Bishop of Aquino, Sora e Pontecorvo (Italy) (1874.06.20 – 1879.03.26), succeeded as Bishop of Aquino, Sora e Pontecorvo (1879.03.26 – 1887.03.14), then Titular Archbishop of Tamiathis (1887.03.14 – 1893.01.16), Secretary of Sacred Congregation of the Propagation of the Faith (1891.06.13 – 1893.05.30), created Cardinal-Priest of S. Pietro in Vincoli (1893.01.19 – 1895.12.07), Prefect of the Roman Sacred Congregation of Indulgences and Sacred Relics (1893.05.30 – 1895.12.07)
 Jacques-Léon Thomine-Desmazures, Paris Foreign Missions Society (M.E.P.) (1857.02.17 – 1864.08.28), Titular Bishop of Synopolis (1856.04.04 – 1869.01.25)

 Apostolic Vicars of Tibet 西藏 
 Joseph-Marie Chauveau, M.E.P. (1864.09.09 – death 1877.12.21), Titular Bishop of Sebastopolis (1846.03.27 – 1877.12.21), formerly Coadjutor Apostolic Vicar of Yunnan 雲南 (China) (1846.03.27 – 1864.09.09)
 Félix Biet, M.E.P. (1878.08.27 – death 1901.09.09), Titular Bishop of Diana (see) (1878.07.23 – 1901.09.09)
 Pierre-Philippe Giraudeau, M.E.P. (1901.09.09 – 1924.12.03 see below), Titular Bishop of Daphnusia (1897.02.15 – 1941.11.13), succeeding as former Coadjutor Vicar Apostolic of Tibet 西藏 (China) (1897.02.15 – 1901.09.09)

 Apostolic Vicars of Tatsienlu 打箭爐 
 Pierre-Philippe Giraudeau, M.E.P. (see above 1924.12.03 – retired 1936.08.09)
 Pierre-Sylvain Valentin, M.E.P. (1936.08.06 – 1946.04.11 'see below), Titular Bishop of Zeugma in Syria (1926.11.16 – 1946.04.11), succeeding as former Coadjutor Vicar Apostolic of Tatsienlu 打箭爐 (1926.11.11 – 1936.08.06)Suffragan Bishops of Kangding 康定 
 Pierre-Sylvain Valentin, M.E.P. (1946.04.11 – death 1962.01.07)
 John Baptist Wang Ruohan, (underground bishop, 1989.11 – ?)
 indefinite vacancy''

See also 
 Anglican Diocese of Szechwan
 Catholic Church in Sichuan
 Christianity in Tibet
 Catholic Church of Yerkalo
 Gospel Church, Kangding
 Maurice Tornay

References

Sources and External links and References
 GCatholic.org
 Catholic Hierarchy

Kangding
Catholic Church in Tibet
Religious organizations established in 1846
Roman Catholic dioceses and prelatures established in the 19th century
1846 establishments in China